Tommy William Polley (born January 18, 1978) is a former American football player who spent six seasons in the NFL. He originally played for the St. Louis Rams from 2001 to 2004 before signing with the Ravens as a free agent in 2005.  He played only one season with the Ravens before signing with the Saints on June 2, 2006.  Polley grew up in Baltimore and played football for Dunbar High School. He was a Top 50 Basketball prospect according to Hoop Scoop.

Early years 
Polley was hailed as one of the top prep athletes in the nation during his senior year at Dunbar High School in Baltimore, which is regarded as one of the top producers of basketball talent in the country. He was USA Today’s Player-of-the-Year in Maryland after recording 208 tackles (136 solo), 16 sacks and eight interceptions as a senior. He also caught 34 passes for 567 yards and three TDs. He led his team to back-to-back state championships as a junior and senior and was named Baltimore area Defensive Player-of-the-Year after both his junior and senior campaigns. He was also regarded as one of the country’s top 60 basketball prospects, and led the Poets to four straight state titles—averaged 20.4 points, 10.7 rebounds, and 8.1 assists per game as a senior.

College career 
Polley enrolled at Florida State University as a scholarship player.  He ended his collegiate career with 289 tackles (170 solo) and was a semi-finalist for the Butkus Award, third-team Football News All-American, First-team All-ACC selection, and a finalist for the ACC’s Brian Piccolo Award (as a result of his courageous comeback from the injury he suffered in the Sugar Bowl). In his final season at FSU, Polley had 100 tackles with 53 solo tackles, 7 tackles for a loss, 2 sacks, broke up 7 passes, recovered a team-high 3 fumbles, and forced one. The defensive leader and captain took the Seminoles to another National Championship (2001 Orange Bowl), even though his team ultimately lost 13-2 to the Oklahoma Sooners. In his junior year in 1999, Polley had an outstanding season when he led Florida State with 109 tackles (67 solos) and also had six stops for loss. He earned First-team All-ACC accolades. In his Sophomore Year (1998) he started 12 of 13 games at both outside linebacking posts and had 59 total tackles (37 solo) and had two tackles for loss. 1997 was his freshman Year (and he totaled 21 tackles with 13 solo stops in the first year of action and played in all 12 games and had at least one tackle in eight games. In 1996, he Redshirted along with most of his class.

Professional career 
Polley was drafted by the St. Louis Rams on the second round of the 2001 NFL Draft. He finished his rookie season with 67 tackles (50 solo). Polley went on to have a 6-year NFL career, amassing 304 tackles with 224 solo stops, and retired in 2007 after a shoulder injury sidelined him for most of the season.  After 4 seasons with the Rams, he finished his career by spending one year with the Baltimore Ravens and his final year with the New Orleans Saints.

Coaching career
Polley coaches for St. Mary's High School in St. Louis, Missouri as the defensive coordinator.

References

1978 births
Living people
American football linebackers
Baltimore Ravens players
Florida State Seminoles football players
New Orleans Saints players
St. Louis Rams players
High school football coaches in Illinois
Players of American football from Baltimore
African-American coaches of American football
African-American players of American football
21st-century African-American sportspeople
20th-century African-American sportspeople